Dobel's Cento (1 March 1989 – 5 February 2018) was a horse who competed in International Grand Prix show jumping competitions. He stood at 16.3½ hh (171 cm) and was an approved stud for Oldenburg, Rhinelander and Belgian Warmblood.

With German rider Otto Becker, the stallion has won medals in the 2000 and 2004 Summer Olympic Games. He was bred by Heinrich Schoof of Büsum, Germany.

Achievements

 HLP reserve winner with 133 points	
 7-year-old winner of the International stallions show jumping (France)
 Winner of the Western European League in 2000
 Winner of the Aachen Grand Prix in 2000 
 Team Gold Medal in Sydney in 2000 and 4th place individually	
 Winner of the World Cup Final in 2002	
 Horse of the year 2002-2003
 Team European Champion 2003
 Winner of the "Grand Prize" of Spruce Meadows (Canada) in 2004
 Winner of the Team Bronze medal in Athens in 2004

References

 pedigree
 Dobel's Cento photo & pedigree

German show jumping horses
1989 animal births
2018 animal deaths
Horses in the Olympics
Individual male horses
Holsteiner horses